Praealticus labrovittatus, the crenulate-lipped rockskipper, is a species of combtooth blenny found in the coral reefs in the western Pacific ocean.  This species reaches a length of  SL.

References

labrovittatus
Taxa named by Hans Bath
Fish described in 1992
Articles containing video clips